Spencer Paul Boyd (born June 26, 1995) is an American professional stock car racing driver. He competes full-time in the NASCAR Craftsman Truck Series, driving the No. 12 Chevrolet Silverado for Young's Motorsports. Boyd has also previously competed in the NASCAR Cup Series and NASCAR Xfinity Series.

Racing career

Early career
Starting at age four in dirt bike racing, Boyd moved up to go-karts a year later. In 2009, he moved up to Legends car racing at Charlotte Motor Speedway and Rockingham Speedway, winning championships at The Rock in 2011 and 2012. From there, Boyd moved up to Pro Trucks and limited late models at Hickory Motor Speedway.

Craftsman Truck Series

Boyd debuted in 2016, driving for MB Motorsports at Martinsville Speedway. A crash hampered his efforts, and he finished 28th. Six races later at Gateway Motorsports Park, he drove Premium Motorsports' No. 49 truck to a top twenty finish (19th). He then returned to the series for the Ford EcoBoost 300, driving MAKE Motorsports' No. 50 truck.

Boyd joined Rick Ware Racing's Truck Series team in 2017, splitting the No. 12 truck with Cody Ware. He failed to qualify at Daytona International Speedway but finished 20th in his next attempt, at Kansas Speedway. He was shuffled to Beaver Motorsports' No. 50 the following week, and finished 20th again. With the disbanding of RWR's Truck operation, the rest of his scheduled starts did not happen. However, Boyd did run the Fred's 250 at Talladega Superspeedway with Copp Motorsports, running as high as fourth before getting caught up in a last-lap wreck to finish 13th.

After not starting a single truck race in 2018, it was announced on January 7, 2019, that Boyd would pilot the No. 20 Chevrolet Silverado for Young's Motorsports full-time in 2019. In the season-opening race, the 2019 NextEra Energy 250, Boyd avoided near-ubiquitous attrition to capture his first top-ten result in fourth. At Kentucky Speedway in July, Boyd was involved in an on-track incident with Natalie Decker, eliminating both drivers from the race. The situation later boiled over into the truck garage, culminating in Decker taking Boyd's hat off his head and slamming it on the ground before being verbally warned by a NASCAR official and escorted away by her team. On July 30, days before the Eldora Dirt Derby, Boyd announced he would withdraw from the race due to back pain that was exacerbated when he decided to compete in the previous week's Gander RV 150 at Pocono against his doctor's suggestions. Landon Huffman replaced him in the No. 20 for Eldora.

Boyd won his first career NASCAR race in the 2019 Sugarlands Shine 250 at Talladega Superspeedway on October 12, 2019. After crossing the finish line second behind Johnny Sauter, Boyd was declared the winner by NASCAR after the conclusion of the race after Sauter was penalized for both blocking Riley Herbst below the inside yellow line and driving his truck below the inside yellow line. Boyd noted that the win was special, as he only secured enough sponsorship to run that race a couple of weeks before the event.

He returned to a full-time Truck schedule with Young's in 2020.

In 2021, dirt-track racer Kyle Strickler replaced Boyd in the Corn Belt 150. That year he would make starts for Jimmy Means Racing and DGM Racing in the Xfinity Series respectively.

During the 2022 season, Boyd suffered a dislocated shoulder in a last lap crash at Las Vegas.

Xfinity Series

Boyd debuted in 2016, driving for Rick Ware Racing at Iowa Speedway. Starting last in the 40-car field, he improved eleven positions during the race to finish 16 laps down in 29th. Boyd then signed on with Obaika Racing, driving the No. 77 to a 35th-place finish at Chicagoland Speedway. On June 5, 2017, it was announced that Boyd would run multiple races in the 2017 NASCAR Xfinity Series season for SS-Green Light Racing, replacing normal driver Ray Black Jr. The deal with SS-Green Light was contingent on sponsorship; running with funding from Grunt Style, Boyd has cracked the top thirty once so far in 2017. In October 2017, it was announced that Boyd would compete full-time in 2018, driving the No. 76 Chevrolet for SS-Green Light Racing. The early part of the season brought some struggles, but the team improved in summer, with a best finish of 17th in the summer Daytona race. Boyd finished the year 26th in points.

Cup Series
On August 7, 2019, it was announced that Boyd was set to make his Monster Energy NASCAR Cup Series career debut in that weekend's race at Michigan International Speedway. The ride would come in the No. 53 for Rick Ware Racing, a team Boyd has previously driven for in the Xfinity and Truck Series.

Personal life
Boyd attended Strayer University after graduating Rowan-Cabarrus Community College. He initially attended Jay M. Robinson High School before finishing high school online due to a heavy racing schedule. Before becoming a full-time NASCAR driver, Boyd sold cars in Concord, North Carolina.

Motorsports career results

NASCAR
(key) (Bold – Pole position awarded by qualifying time. Italics – Pole position earned by points standings or practice time. * – Most laps led.)

Monster Energy Cup Series

Xfinity Series

Craftsman Truck Series

 Season still in progress
 Ineligible for series points

References

External links

 
 

1995 births
Living people
Racing drivers from Missouri
Racing drivers from St. Louis
NASCAR drivers
CARS Tour drivers